Mooresburg (see also Moores Burg) is an unincorporated community in Liberty Township, Montour County, Pennsylvania, United States. Its latitude is 40.982N. Its longitude is -76.705W.

Notable person
Christopher Sholes, the inventor of the first commercially successful typewriter, was born in Mooresburg.

Notes

Unincorporated communities in Pennsylvania
Unincorporated communities in Montour County, Pennsylvania